This is a list of international presidential trips made by Bill Clinton, the 42nd president of the United States. Bill Clinton made 54 international trips to 72 different countries (in addition to visiting the West Bank and Gaza) during his presidency, which began on January 20, 1993 and ended on January 20, 2001.

Clinton visited six continents: Africa, Asia, Australia, Europe, North America, and South America. He took an active role in the Balkans, where he worked to promote peace and stability in and around the former Yugoslavia, and in the Middle East peace process, where he worked to promote peace between Israel and the Palestinians, as well as with the governments of neighboring nations.

Summary
The number of visits per country where President Clinton travelled are:
 One visit to Albania, Argentina, Australia, Austria, Bangladesh, Barbados, Belarus, Botswana, Brazil, Brunei, Bulgaria, Chile, China, Colombia, Costa Rica, Croatia, Czech Republic, Denmark, El Salvador, Finland, Ghana, Greece, Guatemala, Haiti, Honduras, Hungary, India, Indonesia, Kosovo, Kuwait, Latvia, Macedonia, Morocco, Netherlands, New Zealand, Nicaragua, Nigeria, Norway, Oman, Pakistan, Palestinian Authority (West Bank and Gaza), Portugal, Romania, Rwanda, Saudi Arabia, Senegal, Slovakia, Slovenia, South Africa, Syria, Tanzania, Thailand, Turkey, Uganda, Vatican City, Venezuela, and Vietnam
 Two visits to Belgium, Jordan, Mexico, Philippines, Poland, and Spain
 Three visits to  Bosnia and Herzegovina, Ireland, South Korea, and Ukraine
 Four visits to Egypt and Israel
 Five visits to Canada, France, Japan, Russia, and Switzerland
 Six visits to Germany
 Seven visits to United Kingdom
 Eight visits to Italy

1993

1994

1995

1996

1997

1998

1999

2000

Multilateral meetings
Multilateral meetings of the following intergovernmental organizations took place during President Clinton's term in office (1993–2001).

See also
 Foreign policy of the Bill Clinton administration
 Foreign policy of the United States
 List of international trips made by Warren Christopher as United States Secretary of State
 List of international trips made by Madeleine Albright as United States Secretary of State

References

External links
 Travels of President William J. Clinton. U.S. Department of State Office of the Historian.

Presidency of Bill Clinton
1990s politics-related lists
2000s politics-related lists
Clinton, Bill, international
Bill Clinton-related lists